This is a list of amphibians of Western Australia. They are all frogs.

Native species
 Arenophryne rotunda (sandhill frog) (endemic)
 Crinia bilingua (bilingual froglet)
 Crinia georgiana (quacking frog) (endemic)
 Crinia glauerti (Glauert's froglet)
 Crinia insignifera (squelching froglet) (endemic)
 Crinia pseudinsignifera (bleating froglet) (endemic)
 Crinia subinsignifera (South Coast froglet) (endemic)
 Cyclorana australis (giant frog)
 Cyclorana cryptotis (hidden-ear frog)
 Cyclorana cultripes (knife-footed frog)
 Cyclorana longipes (long-footed frog)
 Cyclorana maini (Main's frog)
 Cyclorana platycephala (water-holding frog)
 Cyclorana vagitus (wailing frog)
 Geocrinia alba (white-bellied frog) (endemic)
 Geocrinia leai (Lea's frog) (endemic)
 Geocrinia lutea (nornalup frog) (endemic)
 Geocrinia rosea (roseate frog) (endemic)
 Geocrinia vitellina (yellow-bellied frog) (endemic)
 Heleioporus albopunctatus (western spotted frog) (endemic)
 Heleioporus barycragus (hooting frog) (endemic)
 Heleioporus eyrei (moaning frog) (endemic)
 Heleioporos inornatus (whooping frog) (endemic)
 Heleioporus psammophilus (sand frog) (endemic)
 Limnodynastes convexiusculus (marbled frog)
 Limnodynastes depressus (flat-headed frog)
 Limnodynastes dorsalis (banjo frog) (endemic)
 Limnodynastes ornatus (ornate frog)
 Limnodynastes spenceri (Spencer's frog)
 Litoria adelaidensis (slender tree frog) (endemic)
 Litoria bicolor (northern dwarf tree frog)
 Litoria caerulea (green tree frog)
 Litoria cavernicola (Cave-dwelling frog) (endemic)
 Litoria coplandi (Copland's rock frog)
 Litoria cyclorhyncha (spotted-thighed frog) (endemic)
 Litoria dahlii (Dahl's aquatic frog)
 Litoria inermis (Peter's frog)
 Litoria meiriana (rockhole frog)
 Litoria microbelos (javelin frog)
 Litoria moorei (motorbike frog) (endemic)
 Litoria nasuta (rocket frog)
 Litoria pallida (pale frog)
 Litoria rothii (Roth's tree frog)
 Litoria rubella (desert tree frog)
 Litoria splendida (magnificent tree frog)
 Litoria tornieri (Tornier's frog)
 Litoria watjulumensis (wotjulum frog)
 Megistolotis lignarius (Woodworker frog)
 Metacrinia nichollsi (Nicholl's toadlet) (endemic)
 Myobatrachus gouldii (Turtle frog) (endemic)
 Neobatrachus albipes (white-footed trilling frog) (endemic)
 Neobatrachus aquilonius (northern burrowing frog)
 Neobatrachus centralis (desert trilling frog)
 Neobatrachus fulvus (tawny trilling frog) (endemic)
 Neobatrachus kunapalari (Kunapalari frog) (endemic)
 Neobatrachus pelobatoides (humming frog) (endemic)
 Neobatrachus sutor (shoemaker frog)
 Neobatrachus wilsmorei (Wilsmore's frog) (endemic)
 Notaden melanoscaphus (northern spadefoot)
 Notaden nichollsi (desert spadefoot)
 Notaden weigeli (Weigel's spadefoot) (endemic)
 Pseudophryne douglasi (Douglas' toadlet) (endemic)
 Pseudophryne guentheri (Gunther's toadlet) (endemic)
 Pseudophryne occidentalis (western toadlet)
 Spicospina flammocaerulea (sunset frog) (endemic)
 Uperoleia aspera (Derby toadlet) (endemic)
 Uperoleia borealis (northern toadlet)
 Uperoleia crassa (fat toadlet) (endemic)
 Uperoleia glandulosa (glandular toadlet) (endemic)
 Uperoleia lithomoda (Stonemason's toadlet)
 Uperoleia marmorata (marbled toadlet) (endemic)
 Uperoleia micromeles (Tanami toadlet) (endemic)
 Uperoleia minima (small toadlet) (endemic)
 Uperoleia mjobergi (Mjoberg's toadlet) (endemic)
 Uperoleia russelli (Russell's toadlet) (endemic)
 Uperoleia talpa (mole toadlet) (endemic)
 Uperoleia trachyderma (blacksoil toadlet)

Naturalised species
Currently, the only non-native amphibian naturalised in Western Australia is Limnodynastes tasmaniensis (spotted grass frog).

References

 
Amphibians
Amphibians of Western Australia
Western Australia